The COVID-19 pandemic in San Marino is part of the ongoing worldwide pandemic of coronavirus disease 2019 caused by severe acute respiratory syndrome coronavirus 2. The virus was confirmed to have reached San Marino in February 2020.

As of 11 May 2021, with 5,083 confirmed cases out of a population of 33,600, it was the country with the fourth-highest percentage of confirmed cases per capita at 15.13% – 1 confirmed case per 7 inhabitants. Also, with 90 confirmed deaths, the country has one of the highest rate of confirmed deaths per capita at 0.268% of the total population – 1 death per 373 inhabitants. The crude fatality rate is 2.63%. It was once declared "Covid-free" on 26 June 2020, although on 9 July it had another case, and while this had recovered by the end of the month, the epidemics has returned later and most of recorded covid-assigned fatalities had happened after that.

Background 
On 12 January 2020, the World Health Organization (WHO) confirmed that a novel coronavirus was the cause of a respiratory illness in a cluster of people in Wuhan, Hubei, China, which was reported to the WHO on 31 December 2019.

The case fatality ratio for COVID-19 has been much lower than SARS of 2003, but the transmission has been significantly greater, with a significant total death toll.

Timeline

February 2020
On 27 February, San Marino confirmed its first case, an 88-year-old man with pre-existing medical conditions. He was hospitalised in Rimini, Italy.

March 2020
On 1 March, seven more cases were confirmed and the Health Emergency Coordination Group confirmed that the 88-year-old man had died, becoming the first Sammarinese to die of the virus.

On 8 March, the number of confirmed cases had increased to 36.

On 10 March 63 cases were confirmed. On 11 March 66 cases were confirmed, and the death count increased to 3.

On 12 March, confirmed cases count increased to 67 and the death count to 5.

On 14 March, the government ordered a nationwide quarantine until 6 April.

June 2020
San Marino was declared to have no active cases on 26 June. In total, 698 cases of COVID-19 had been identified, of whom 42 died and the remaining 656 recovered.

July 2020
On 9 July, one case of COVID-19 was identified and isolated. The patient recovered and by the end of the month, the number of active cases in the country returned to zero.

December 2020
As 28 December, the total number of infected people is 2,275. There are 57 deaths and 1,955 recovered.

February 2021
On 2 February 2021, Fausta Morganti, who was Captain Regent between 1 April 2005 and 1 October 2005 died from COVID-19 at the age of 76.

May 2021
Health Minister Roberto Ciavatta announced that anyone booking a hotel in San Marino for at least three nights could receive the Sputnik V COVID-19 vaccine for €50.

As of May 2021, San Marino had administered 36,000 doses and fully vaccinated approximately 22,000 people.

Statistics

Confirmed new cases per day

Confirmed deaths per day

See also
Healthcare in San Marino
COVID-19 pandemic by country and territory
COVID-19 pandemic in Europe
COVID-19 pandemic in Italy

References

 
San Marino
San Marino
Disease outbreaks in San Marino
2020 in San Marino
2021 in San Marino